Asia Atlantic Airlines (was a charter airline headquartered in Bangkok, Thailand. It was a subsidiary of the Japanese travel agency H.I.S.

History
Asia Atlantic Airlines (AAA) launched initiated operations on maiden flight departed Suvarnabhumi Airport for Narita International Airport on August 19, 2013.

The airline was a joint venture between Japanese travel agent H.I.S and Thai hotelier Baiyoke Group.

Asia Atlantic Airlines operated out of two hubs: Bangkok Suvarnabhumi and Tokyo Narita International Airport. The fleet consisted of two B767-300ERs with two configurations – the first one (HS-AAC) had 252 seats, including 12 business and 240 economy class; and the second one (HS-AAB) consisted of 261 seats, with 18 business and 243 economy class seats.

Corporate affairs
The airline head office was on the 11th floor of the Times Square Building in Khlong Toei District, Bangkok.

Destinations
Asia Atlantic Airlines served or planned to serve the following destinations:

Fleet

The Asia Atlantic Airlines fleet consisted of the following aircraft (as of August 2016):

References

External links

 Asia Atlantic Airlines Official website
 Asia Atlantic Airlines Hisgo

Defunct airlines of Thailand
Companies based in Bangkok
Airlines established in 2012
Airlines disestablished in 2018
Thai companies established in 2012
2018 disestablishments in Thailand